Naomi J. Halas is the Stanley C. Moore Professor in Electrical and Computer Engineering, and Professor of biomedical engineering, chemistry and physics at Rice University. She is also the founding director of Rice University Laboratory for Nanophotonics, and the Smalley-Curl Institute. She invented the first nanoparticle with tunable plasmonic resonances, which are controlled by their shape and structure, and has won numerous awards for her pioneering work in the field of nanophotonics and plasmonics. She was also part of a team that developed the first dark pulse soliton in 1987 while working for IBM.

She is a Fellow of nine professional societies, including the Optical Society of America, the American Physical Society, the International Society for Optical Engineering (SPIE), the Institute of Electrical and Electronics Engineers (IEEE), and the American Association for the Advancement of Science.

Halas was elected a member of the National Academy of Engineering in 2014 for nanoscale engineering of optical resonances and lineshapes.

Her current research at Rice University focuses on studying light-matter interaction in plasmonic nanoparticles for applications in chemical sensing, biomedical sciences, catalysis, and energy.

Education
Halas received her bachelor's degree from La Salle University in 1980. She obtained her master's degree from Bryn Mawr College in 1984 and her doctorate from Bryn Mawr in 1987. She was a graduate research fellow at the IBM Thomas J Watson Research Center during her doctoral studies, during which time she developed the first "dark pulse" soliton with Dieter Kroekel, Giampiero Giuliani and Daniel Grischkowsky. A "dark pulse" soliton is a standing wave that propagates through an optical fiber without spreading and which consists of a short interruption of a light pulse. She was also part of the first research efforts focusing on time-domain terahertz spectroscopy during her time at IBM.

Career and research
Halas was a postdoctoral research fellow at AT&T Bell Laboratories before joining Rice University in 1990, where she now heads the Nanoengineering research group bearing her name. She was appointed Professor in the Department of Electrical and Computer Engineering and the Department of Chemistry in 1999, and three years later was named the Stanley C. Moore Professor in Electrical and Computer Engineering. In 2004, she became the director of the Laboratory for Nanophotonics at Rice. She has also been a Professor in the Department of Biomedical Engineering and the Department Physics since 2006 and 2009, respectively.

Plasmonic nanoshells
Halas' work in the 21st century focuses on noble metal nanoshells covering semiconducting or insulating cores. Her research was the first to experimentally show that nanoshells with different dimensions and shapes have different plasmonic resonances, and that these resonances could therefore be tuned by changing nanoparticle geometries. Controlling light-matter interaction of these plasmonic nanoparticles includes applications in chemical sensing, catalysis, and energy harvesting, as well as photodynamic therapy and other biomedical applications.

In 2003, Halas and her colleague Jennifer L. West were awarded the Nanotechnology Now Best Discovery Award for their groundbreaking work to develop a cancer therapy based on metallic nanoshells. Halas also received the Innovator Award from the US Department of Defense Congressionally Directed Breast Cancer Research Program, and was awarded a four-year $3 million grant to conduct further research into the treatment.

Other research
Her research also looks at how to integrate plasmonic particles with other photonic systems. The Halas groups collaborates with the Energy Frontier Research Center at the National Renewable Energy Laboratory to study using plasmonics to improve the energy harvesting properties of semiconductor quantum dots and nanocrystals. They use surface-enhanced Raman spectroscopy and surface-enhanced infrared absorption to develop single-molecule sensing techniques.

Awards and honors
 2018 Julius Edgar Lilienfeld Prize
 2017 Willis E. Lamb Award
 2017 Weizmann Women and Science Award
 2015 R. W. Wood Prize, Optical Society of America
 2014 SPIE Biophotonics Technology Innovator Award
 2014 Frank Isakson Prize for Optical Effects in Solids, American Physical Society
 2012 Doctor of Science honoris causa, University of Victoria, Canada
 2012 Alexander M. Cruickshank Award, Gordon Research Conferences
 2010 R. E. Tressler Award, Materials Science and Engineering, Penn State University
 2007 Doctor of Science honoris causa, La Salle University
 2003 Nanotechnology Now Best Discovery Award

She has been elected to the National Academy of Sciences (2013), National Academy of Engineering (2014), National Academy of Inventors (2015), American Association for the Advancement of Science (2005), and American Academy of Arts and Sciences (2009). She is a fellow of the American Physical Society (2001), the Optical Society of America (2003), SPIE (2007), the Institute of Electrical and Electronics Engineers (2008), and the Materials Research Society (2013).

Selected publications

References

External links 
 Naomi Halas Rice webpage
 
 The American Hungarian Federation: Featured Member
 CNN biography and interview with Naomi Halas, June 2007
 An SPIE video interview with Naomi Halas about metallic nanoparticles
 Nanotechnology Now article of Best Discovery Award
 Bryan Bunch and Alexander Hellemans eds History of Science and Technology Houghton Mifflin, 2004. 1987 entry
 Texas Nanotechnology Initiative, Sweating the Small Stuff: Nanotechnology and Texas' Economic Future, 2003
 PBS NOVA ScienceNow Profile - a free 10-minute video clip
 

Living people
Year of birth missing (living people)
American electrical engineers
Bryn Mawr College alumni
La Salle University alumni
Rice University faculty
Place of birth missing (living people)
American women chemists
American nanotechnologists
Fellows of the American Physical Society
Fellows of the American Association for the Advancement of Science
Fellow Members of the IEEE
Fellows of Optica (society)
Fellows of SPIE
Members of the United States National Academy of Sciences
American women engineers
21st-century American engineers
Members of the United States National Academy of Engineering
20th-century American engineers
Optical engineers
Women in optics
Optical physicists
American women physicists
21st-century American physicists
21st-century women engineers
Electrical engineering academics
American biomedical engineers
20th-century American women
American women academics
21st-century American women scientists